Cynomacrurus piriei, the dogtooth grenadier, is a species of rattail that occurs in the southern oceans, mostly south of the Antarctic Convergence. This species grows to a length of  TL.

In 1909, Louis Dollo paper describing this species and circumscribing its monospecific genus Cynomacrurus was published. The holotype was collected by the Scotia during the Scottish National Antarctic Expedition on 15 March 1904; it was later deposited in the Scottish Oceanographical Laboratory. The specific epithet was named in honor of Harvey Pirie, who was the surgeon, geologist, and bacteriologist aboard the Scotia.

References

Macrouridae

Fish described in 1909